Zahrádka is a municipality and village in Třebíč District in the Vysočina Region of the Czech Republic. It has about 100 inhabitants.

Administrative parts
The village of Častotice is an administrative part of Zahrádka.

References

Villages in Třebíč District